This is a list of the mammal species recorded in the Republic of the Congo. Of the mammal species in the Republic of the Congo, five are endangered, nine are vulnerable, and four are near threatened.

The following tags are used to highlight each species' conservation status as assessed by the International Union for Conservation of Nature:

Some species were assessed using an earlier set of criteria. Species assessed using this system have the following instead of near threatened and least concern categories:

Order: Afrosoricida (tenrecs and golden moles) 

The order Afrosoricida contains the golden moles of southern Africa and the tenrecs of Madagascar and Africa, two families of small mammals that were traditionally part of the order Insectivora.

Family: Tenrecidae (tenrecs)
Subfamily: Potamogalinae
Genus: Potamogale
 Giant otter shrew, Potamogale velox LC
Family: Chrysochloridae
Subfamily: Amblysominae
Genus: Calcochloris
 Congo golden mole, Calcochloris leucorhinus DD

Order: Hyracoidea (hyraxes) 

The hyraxes are any of four species of fairly small, thickset, herbivorous mammals in the order Hyracoidea. About the size of a domestic cat they are well-furred, with rounded bodies and a stumpy tail. They are native to Africa and the Middle East.

Family: Procaviidae (hyraxes)
Genus: Dendrohyrax
 Western tree hyrax, D. dorsalis

Order: Proboscidea (elephants) 

 
The elephants comprise three living species and are the largest living terrestrial animals.

Family: Elephantidae (elephants)
Genus: Loxodonta
African forest elephant, L. cyclotis

Order: Sirenia (manatees and dugongs) 

Sirenia is an order of fully aquatic, herbivorous mammals that inhabit rivers, estuaries, coastal marine waters, swamps, and marine wetlands. All four species are endangered.

Family: Trichechidae
Genus: Trichechus
 African manatee, Trichechus senegalensis VU

Order: Primates 

The order Primates contains humans and their closest relatives: lemurs, lorisoids, tarsiers, monkeys, and apes.

Suborder: Strepsirrhini
Infraorder: Lemuriformes
Superfamily: Lorisoidea
Family: Lorisidae
Genus: Arctocebus
 Golden angwantibo, Arctocebus aureus LR/nt
Genus: Perodicticus
 Potto, Perodicticus potto LR/lc
Family: Galagidae
Genus: Sciurocheirus
 Bioko Allen's bushbaby, Sciurocheirus alleni LR/nt
Genus: Galagoides
 Prince Demidoff's bushbaby, Galagoides demidovii LR/lc
Genus: Euoticus
 Southern needle-clawed bushbaby, Euoticus elegantulus LR/nt
Suborder: Haplorhini
Infraorder: Simiiformes
Parvorder: Catarrhini
Superfamily: Cercopithecoidea
Family: Cercopithecidae (Old World monkeys)
Genus: Allenopithecus
 Allen's swamp monkey, Allenopithecus nigroviridis LR/nt
Genus: Miopithecus
 Angolan talapoin, Miopithecus talapoin LR/lc
 Gabon talapoin, Miopithecus ogouensis LR/lc
Genus: Chlorocebus
 Malbrouck, Chlorocebus cynosuros LR/lc
Genus: Cercopithecus
 Moustached guenon, Cercopithecus cephus LR/lc
 De Brazza's monkey, Cercopithecus neglectus LR/lc
 Greater spot-nosed monkey, Cercopithecus nictitans LR/lc
 Crowned guenon, Cercopithecus pogonias LR/lc
Genus: Lophocebus
 Grey-cheeked mangabey, Lophocebus albigena LR/lc
Genus: Papio
 Olive baboon, Papio anubis LR/lc
Genus: Cercocebus
 Collared mangabey, Cercocebus torquatus LR/nt
Genus: Mandrillus
 Mandrill, Mandrillus sphinx VU
Subfamily: Colobinae
Genus: Colobus
 Mantled guereza, Colobus guereza LR/lc
 Black colobus, Colobus satanas VU
Genus: Procolobus
 Red colobus, Procolobus badius EN
 Pennant's colobus, Procolobus pennantii EN
Superfamily: Hominoidea
Family: Hominidae (great apes)
Subfamily: Homininae
Tribe: Gorillini
Genus: Gorilla
 Western gorilla, Gorilla gorilla EN
Tribe: Panini
Genus: Pan
 Common chimpanzee, Pan troglodytes EN

Order: Rodentia (rodents) 

Rodents make up the largest order of mammals, with over 40% of mammalian species. They have two incisors in the upper and lower jaw which grow continually and must be kept short by gnawing.

Suborder: Hystricognathi
Family: Hystricidae (Old World porcupines)
Genus: Atherurus
 African brush-tailed porcupine, Atherurus africanus LC
Genus: Hystrix
 Cape porcupine, Hystrix africaeaustralis LC
Family: Thryonomyidae (cane rats)
Genus: Thryonomys
 Greater cane rat, Thryonomys swinderianus LC
Suborder: Sciurognathi
Family: Anomaluridae
Subfamily: Anomalurinae
Genus: Anomalurus
 Lord Derby's scaly-tailed squirrel, Anomalurus derbianus LC
 Dwarf scaly-tailed squirrel, Anomalurus pusillus LC
Genus: Anomalurops
 Beecroft's scaly-tailed squirrel, Anomalurops beecrofti LC
Subfamily: Zenkerellinae
Genus: Idiurus
 Long-eared flying mouse, Idiurus macrotis LC
 Flying mouse, Idiurus zenkeri DD
Family: Sciuridae (squirrels)
Subfamily: Xerinae
Tribe: Protoxerini
Genus: Epixerus
 Biafran palm squirrel, Epixerus wilsoni DD
Genus: Funisciurus
 Lady Burton's rope squirrel, Funisciurus isabella LC
 Ribboned rope squirrel, Funisciurus lemniscatus DD
 Fire-footed rope squirrel, Funisciurus pyrropus LC
Genus: Myosciurus
 African pygmy squirrel, Myosciurus pumilio DD
Genus: Paraxerus
 Green bush squirrel, Paraxerus poensis LC
Genus: Protoxerus
 Forest giant squirrel, Protoxerus stangeri LC
Family: Nesomyidae
Subfamily: Dendromurinae
Genus: Dendroprionomys
 Velvet climbing mouse, Dendroprionomys rousseloti DD
Subfamily: Cricetomyinae
Genus: Cricetomys
 Emin's pouched rat, Cricetomys emini LC
 Gambian pouched rat, Cricetomys gambianus LC
Family: Muridae (mice, rats, voles, gerbils, hamsters, etc.)
Subfamily: Deomyinae
Genus: Deomys
 Link rat, Deomys ferrugineus LC
Genus: Lophuromys
 Yellow-bellied brush-furred rat, Lophuromys luteogaster LC
 Fire-bellied brush-furred rat, Lophuromys nudicaudus LC
 Rusty-bellied brush-furred rat, Lophuromys sikapusi LC
Subfamily: Murinae
Genus: Colomys
 African wading rat, Colomys goslingi LC
Genus: Grammomys
 Shining thicket rat, Grammomys rutilans LC
Genus: Heimyscus
 African smoky mouse, Heimyscus fumosus LC
Genus: Hybomys
 Peters's striped mouse, Hybomys univittatus LC
Genus: Hylomyscus
 Beaded wood mouse, Hylomyscus aeta LC
 Allen's wood mouse, Hylomyscus alleni LC
 Little wood mouse, Hylomyscus parvus LC
 Stella wood mouse, Hylomyscus stella LC
Genus: Lemniscomys
 Typical striped grass mouse, Lemniscomys striatus LC
Genus: Malacomys
 Big-eared swamp rat, Malacomys longipes LC
Genus: Mastomys
 Guinea multimammate mouse, Mastomys erythroleucus LC
 Natal multimammate mouse, Mastomys natalensis LC
Genus: Mus
 African pygmy mouse, Mus minutoides LC
 Peters's mouse, Mus setulosus LC
 Thomas's pygmy mouse, Mus sorella LC
Genus: Mylomys
 African groove-toothed rat, Mylomys dybowskii LC
Genus: Myomyscus
 Brockman's rock mouse, Myomyscus brockmani LC
Genus: Oenomys
 Common rufous-nosed rat, Oenomys hypoxanthus LC
Genus: Praomys
 Jackson's soft-furred mouse, Praomys jacksoni LC
 Petter's soft-furred mouse, Praomys petteri LC
 Tullberg's soft-furred mouse, Praomys tullbergi LC
Genus: Stochomys
 Target rat, Stochomys longicaudatus LC

Order: Soricomorpha (shrews, moles, and solenodons) 

The "shrew-forms" are insectivorous mammals. The shrews and solenodons closely resemble mice while the moles are stout-bodied burrowers.

Family: Soricidae (shrews)
Subfamily: Crocidurinae
Genus: Crocidura
 Bates's shrew, Crocidura batesi LC
 Long-footed shrew, Crocidura crenata LC
 Dent's shrew, Crocidura denti LC
 Long-tailed musk shrew, Crocidura dolichura LC
 Goliath shrew, Crocidura goliath LC
 Grasse's shrew, Crocidura grassei LC
 Hildegarde's shrew, Crocidura hildegardeae LC
 Butiaba naked-tailed shrew, Crocidura littoralis LC
 Ludia's shrew, Crocidura ludia LC
 Turbo shrew, Crocidura turba LC
Genus: Paracrocidura
 Lesser large-headed shrew, Paracrocidura schoutedeni LC
Genus: Suncus
 Remy's pygmy shrew, Suncus remyi LC
Genus: Sylvisorex
 Johnston's forest shrew, Sylvisorex johnstoni LC
 Climbing shrew, Sylvisorex megalura LC
 Greater forest shrew, Sylvisorex ollula LC
Subfamily: Myosoricinae
Genus: Congosorex
 Lesser Congo shrew, Congosorex verheyeni LC

Order: Chiroptera (bats) 

The bats' most distinguishing feature is that their forelimbs are developed as wings, making them the only mammals capable of flight. Bat species account for about 20% of all mammals.

Family: Pteropodidae (flying foxes, Old World fruit bats)
Subfamily: Pteropodinae
Genus: Eidolon
 Straw-coloured fruit bat, Eidolon helvum LC
Genus: Epomophorus
 Lesser Angolan epauletted fruit bat, Epomophorus grandis DD
 Ethiopian epauletted fruit bat, Epomophorus labiatus LC
 Wahlberg's epauletted fruit bat, Epomophorus wahlbergi LC
Genus: Epomops
 Franquet's epauletted fruit bat, Epomops franqueti LC
Genus: Hypsignathus
 Hammer-headed bat, Hypsignathus monstrosus LC
Genus: Lissonycteris
 Angolan rousette, Lissonycteris angolensis LC
Genus: Micropteropus
 Peters's dwarf epauletted fruit bat, Micropteropus pusillus LC
Genus: Myonycteris
 Little collared fruit bat, Myonycteris torquata LC
Genus: Rousettus
 Egyptian fruit bat, Rousettus aegyptiacus LC
Genus: Scotonycteris
 Pohle's fruit bat, Scotonycteris ophiodon EN
 Zenker's fruit bat, Scotonycteris zenkeri NT
Subfamily: Macroglossinae
Genus: Megaloglossus
 Woermann's bat, Megaloglossus woermanni LC
Family: Vespertilionidae
Subfamily: Myotinae
Genus: Myotis
 Rufous mouse-eared bat, Myotis bocagii LC
Subfamily: Vespertilioninae
Genus: Glauconycteris
 Silvered bat, Glauconycteris argentata LC
 Bibundi bat, Glauconycteris egeria DD
 Butterfly bat, Glauconycteris variegata LC
Genus: Hypsugo
 Broad-headed pipistrelle, Hypsugo crassulus LC
 Mouselike pipistrelle, Hypsugo musciculus DD
Genus: Mimetillus
 Moloney's mimic bat, Mimetillus moloneyi LC
Genus: Neoromicia
 Cape serotine, Neoromicia capensis LC
 Tiny serotine, Neoromicia guineensis LC
 Banana pipistrelle, Neoromicia nanus LC
 Rendall's serotine, Neoromicia rendalli LC
 Somali serotine, Neoromicia somalicus LC
 White-winged serotine, Neoromicia tenuipinnis LC
Genus: Scotoecus
 Hinde's lesser house bat, Scotoecus hindei DD
Genus: Scotophilus
 African yellow bat, Scotophilus dinganii LC
Subfamily: Miniopterinae
Genus: Miniopterus
 Least long-fingered bat, Miniopterus minor NT
Family: Molossidae
Genus: Chaerephon
 Nigerian free-tailed bat, Chaerephon nigeriae LC
 Little free-tailed bat, Chaerephon pumila LC
Genus: Mops
 Sierra Leone free-tailed bat, Mops brachypterus LC
 Railer bat, Mops thersites LC
Family: Emballonuridae
Genus: Coleura
 African sheath-tailed bat, Coleura afra LC
Genus: Saccolaimus
 Pel's pouched bat, Saccolaimus peli NT
Genus: Taphozous
 Mauritian tomb bat, Taphozous mauritianus LC
Family: Nycteridae
Genus: Nycteris
 Bate's slit-faced bat, Nycteris arge LC
 Large slit-faced bat, Nycteris grandis LC
 Hairy slit-faced bat, Nycteris hispida LC
 Large-eared slit-faced bat, Nycteris macrotis LC
 Egyptian slit-faced bat, Nycteris thebaica LC
Family: Rhinolophidae
Subfamily: Rhinolophinae
Genus: Rhinolophus
 Adam's horseshoe bat, Rhinolophus adami DD
 Halcyon horseshoe bat, Rhinolophus alcyone LC
 Rüppell's horseshoe bat, Rhinolophus fumigatus LC
 Lander's horseshoe bat, Rhinolophus landeri LC
 Forest horseshoe bat, Rhinolophus silvestris VU
 Swinny's horseshoe bat, Rhinolophus swinnyi NT
Subfamily: Hipposiderinae
Genus: Hipposideros
 Benito roundleaf bat, Hipposideros beatus LC
 Sundevall's roundleaf bat, Hipposideros caffer LC
 Cyclops roundleaf bat, Hipposideros cyclops LC
 Giant roundleaf bat, Hipposideros gigas LC
 Noack's roundleaf bat, Hipposideros ruber LC
Genus: Triaenops
 Persian trident bat, Triaenops persicus LC

Order: Pholidota (pangolins) 

The order Pholidota comprises the eight species of pangolin. Pangolins are anteaters and have the powerful claws, elongated snout and long tongue seen in the other unrelated anteater species.

Family: Manidae
Genus: Manis
 Giant pangolin, Manis gigantea LR/lc
 Long-tailed pangolin, Manis tetradactyla LR/lc
 Tree pangolin, Manis tricuspis LR/lc

Order: Cetacea (whales and dolphins and porpoises) 

The order Cetacea includes whales, dolphins and porpoises. They are the mammals most fully adapted to aquatic life with a spindle-shaped nearly hairless body, protected by a thick layer of blubber, and forelimbs and tail modified to provide propulsion underwater.

Suborder: Mysticeti
Family: Balaenopteridae
Subfamily: Megapterinae
Genus: Megaptera
 Humpback whale, Megaptera novaeangliae LC (possibly not as abundant as other populations)
Subfamily: Balaenopterinae
Genus: Balaenoptera
 Blue whale, Balaenoptera m. musculus intermedia EN
 Southern fin whale, Balaenoptera physalus quoyi EN
 Southern sei whale, Balaenoptera borealis schlegelii EN
 Bryde's whale, Balaenoptera edeni DD
 Antarctic minke whale, Balaenoptera bonaerensis DD
 Common minke whale, Balaenoptera acutorostrata LR/nt
Suborder: Odontoceti
Family: Physeteridae
Genus: Physeter
 Sperm whale, Physeter macrocephalus VU
Superfamily: Platanistoidea
Family: Kogiidae
Genus: Kogia
 Pygmy sperm whale, Kogia breviceps DD
 Dwarf sperm whale, Kogia sima DD
Family: Delphinidae (marine dolphins)
Genus: Stenella
 Pantropical spotted dolphin, Stenella attenuata DD
 Clymene dolphin, Stenella clymene DD
 Striped dolphin, Stenella coeruleoalba DD
 Atlantic spotted dolphin, Stenella frontalis DD
 Spinner dolphin, Stenella longirostris DD
Genus: Steno
 Rough-toothed dolphin, Steno bredanensis DD
Genus: Sousa
 Atlantic humpback dolphin, Sousa teuszii NT (now rare)
Genus: Tursiops
 Common bottlenose dolphin, Tursiops truncatus DD
Genus: Lagenodelphis
 Fraser's dolphin, Lagenodelphis hosei DD
Genus: Feresa
 Pygmy killer whale, Feresa attenuata DD
Genus: Pseudorca
 False killer whale, Pseudorca crassidens DD
Genus: Globicephala
 Short-finned pilot whale, Globicephala macrorhynchus DD
Genus: Orcinus
 Orca, Orcinus orca DD
Genus: Peponocephala
 Melon-headed whale, Peponocephala electra DD
Family: Ziphidae
Genus: Mesoplodon
 Blainville's beaked whale, Mesoplodon densirostris DD
Genus: Ziphius
 Cuvier's beaked whale, Ziphius cavirostris DD

Order: Carnivora (carnivorans) 

There are over 260 species of carnivorans, the majority of which feed primarily on meat. They have a characteristic skull shape and dentition.
Suborder: Feliformia
Family: Felidae
Subfamily: Felinae
Genus: Caracal
African golden cat, C. aurata 
Genus: Leptailurus
 Serval, Leptailurus serval 
Subfamily: Pantherinae
Genus: Panthera
 Leopard, P. pardus 
Family: Viverridae
Subfamily: Viverrinae
Genus: Civettictis
African civet, C. civetta 
Genus: Genetta
 Servaline genet, G. servalina 
King genet, G. poensis 
Genus: Poiana
 Central African oyan, Poiana richardsonii 
Family: Nandiniidae
Genus: Nandinia
African palm civet, N. binotata 
Family: Herpestidae
Genus: Bdeogale
 Black-footed mongoose, B. nigripes 
Genus: Crossarchus
 Alexander's kusimanse, C. alexandri 
Genus: Herpestes
 Common slender mongoose, H. sanguineus 
Genus: Xenogale
 Long-nosed mongoose, H. naso 
Family: Hyaenidae
Genus: Crocuta
 Spotted hyena, C. crocuta 
Suborder: Caniformia
Family: Canidae
Genus: Lupulella
 Side-striped jackal, L. adusta  
Family: Mustelidae
Genus: Ictonyx
 Striped polecat, I. striatus 
Genus: Mellivora
 Honey badger, M. capensis 
Genus: Lutra
 Speckle-throated otter, H. maculicollis 
Genus: Aonyx
 African clawless otter, A. capensis

Order: Artiodactyla (even-toed ungulates) 

The even-toed ungulates are ungulates whose weight is borne about equally by the third and fourth toes, rather than mostly or entirely by the third as in perissodactyls. There are about 220 artiodactyl species, including many that are of great economic importance to humans.
Family: Suidae (pigs)
Subfamily: Phacochoerinae
Genus: Phacochoerus
 Common warthog, Phacochoerus africanus
Subfamily: Suinae
Genus: Hylochoerus
 Giant forest hog, Hylochoerus meinertzhageni
Genus: Potamochoerus
 Red river hog, Potamochoerus porcus
Family: Hippopotamidae (hippopotamuses)
Genus: Hippopotamus
Hippopotamus, H. amphibius  
Family: Tragulidae
Genus: Hyemoschus
 Water chevrotain, Hyemoschus aquaticus
Family: Bovidae (cattle, antelope, sheep, goats)
Subfamily: Antilopinae
Genus: Neotragus
 Bates's pygmy antelope, Neotragus batesi
Subfamily: Bovinae
Genus: Syncerus
 African buffalo, Syncerus caffer
Genus: Tragelaphus
 Bongo, Tragelaphus eurycerus
 Bushbuck, Tragelaphus scriptus
 Sitatunga, Tragelaphus spekii
Subfamily: Cephalophinae
Genus: Cephalophus
 Peters's duiker, Cephalophus callipygus LR/nt
 Bay duiker, Cephalophus dorsalis LR/nt
 White-bellied duiker, Cephalophus leucogaster LR/nt
 Blue duiker, Cephalophus monticola LR/lc
 Black-fronted duiker, Cephalophus nigrifrons LR/nt
 Ogilby's duiker, Cephalophus ogilbyi LR/nt
 Yellow-backed duiker, Cephalophus silvicultor LR/nt
Genus: Sylvicapra
 Common duiker, Sylvicapra grimmia LR/lc
Subfamily: Reduncinae
Genus: Kobus
 Waterbuck, Kobus ellipsiprymnus LR/cd
Genus: Redunca
 Southern reedbuck, Redunca arundinum LR/cd

References

See also
List of chordate orders
Lists of mammals by region
List of prehistoric mammals
Mammal classification
List of mammals described in the 2000s
List of birds of the Republic of the Congo

Congo
Congo
Mammals